NHL 2018 may refer to:
2017–18 NHL season
2018–19 NHL season
NHL 18, video game
2018 National Hurling League